Lawley may refer to:

Places
 Lawley, Shropshire, England
 Lawley, Gauteng, South Africa
 Lawley Street railway station, in Birmingham, England
 Mount Lawley, Western Australia
 Mount Lawley Senior High School
 Mount Lawley railway station

Other uses
 Lawley (surname)